Karymsky Lake is a volcanic crater lake located in the Akademia Nauk volcano on the Kamchatka Peninsula, Russia. With a radius of  it was once one of the world's largest fresh water lakes , but as a result of a recent  eruption toxic gases turned this into one of the largest acid water lakes.

References

Lakes of Kamchatka Krai
Volcanic crater lakes
Volcanoes of the Kamchatka Peninsula
Calderas of Russia
Pleistocene calderas